The 14th Division was one of the divisions of the Spanish Republican Army that were organized during the Spanish Civil War on the basis of the Mixed Brigades. The division participated in the Battle of Guadalajara.

History 
The unit was partly created from the Mera Column, led by Cipriano Mera and elements from other Mixed Brigades. The new division was integrated – together with the 11th and 12th divisions – in the new 4th Army Corps, under the command of Enrique Jurado Barrio. The 12th International Brigade — within which the Garibaldi Battalion was integrated – was also assigned to the 14th Division.

Shortly after its creation, the 14th Division, under Vicente Rojo Lluch faced the Battle of Guadalajara. With the support of the other republican divisions, the enemy attack was stopped and a counter-attack began. On 18 March the division, operating on the right flank of the republican front, and the 11th Division of Enrique Lister, with the support of 70 Soviet T-26 tanks, launched an attack and seized the town of Brihuega; the nationalist forces fled in disarray, leaving behind prisoners and war equipment. By the end of March the front stabilized after the Republicans managed to recover a large part of the territory.

In July 1937, facing the Battle of Brunete, the unit was initially placed in reserve. It intervened towards the end of the fighting, after the defeat of Lister's 11th Division. On 24 July it was scheduled to relieve Líster's forces from the front line, although the fighting prevented it. On the morning of 25 July units of the 14th Division launched a counterattack to the southwest of Brunete, counting on the support of Republican aviation. Despite the resistance offered by the 14th Division, it failed to maintain its positions. Once the fighting in Brunete ended, the division returned to the Guadalajara front, where it remained for the following months without intervening in relevant operations.

In the spring of 1938 it was sent to the Levante front as a reserve unit, acting as relief for other units broken by enemy offensives.

In March 1939 some of its units participated in the Casado coup. This was the case of the 70th Mixed Brigade of Bernabé López Calle, which on the morning of 6 March occupied various strategic points in Madrid, such as the Alameda de Osuna, the Ministry of Finance and the Telefónica building. Members of the 35th and 50th mixed brigades also took part in support of the rebellious forces. The 14th Division dissolved itself shortly after, with the end of the war.

Command 
Commanders
 Vicente Rojo Lluch;
 Cipriano Mera;
 Francisco Jiménez Durán;
 Rafael Gutiérrez Caro;
 Joaquín Martínez Sánchez

Commissars
 Mariano Valle Soria, of the CNT;

Chiefs of Staff
 Antonio Verardini Díez de Ferreti

Battles

See also 
 List of Spanish Republican divisions
 Mixed Brigades
 Mera Column

References

Bibliography 
 
 
 
 
 
 
 
 
 
 
 
 
 
 
 

Military units and formations established in 1937
Military units and formations disestablished in 1939
Divisions of Spain
Military units and formations of the Spanish Civil War
Military history of Spain
Armed Forces of the Second Spanish Republic
1937 establishments in Spain
1937 disestablishments in Spain
Militarized anarchist formations